The 2006 Tim Hortons Brier, the Canadian men's national curling championship, was held from March 11 to 19 at the Brandt Centre in Regina, Saskatchewan. In the final, Quebec's Jean-Michel Ménard rink became only the second Quebec team to win the Brier. They also became the first francophone team to win. They defeated Ontario's Glenn Howard in the final.

Teams

Round-robin standings
Final round-robin standings

Round-robin results
All draw times are listed in Eastern Standard Time (UTC−5).

Draw 1
Saturday, March 11, 15:00

Draw 2
Saturday, March 11, 20:00

Draw 3
Sunday, March 12, 10:00

Draw 4
Sunday, March 12, 15:00

Draw 5
Sunday, March 12, 20:00

Draw 6
Monday, March 13, 10:00

Draw 7
Monday, March 13, 15:00

Draw 8
Monday, March 13, 20:00

Draw 9
Tuesday, March 14, 10:00

Draw 10
Tuesday, March 14, 15:00

Draw 11
Tuesday, March 14, 20:00

Draw 12
Wednesday, March 15, 10:00

Draw 13
Wednesday, March 15, 15:00

Draw 14
Wednesday, March 15, 20:00

Draw 15
Thursday, March 16, 9:30

Draw 16
Thursday, March 16, 14:00

Draw 17
Thursday, March 16, 20:00

Playoffs
The Tim Hortons Brier uses the page playoff system where the top four teams with the best records at the end of round-robin play meet in the playoff rounds. The first and second place teams play each other, with the winner advancing directly to the final. The winner of the other page playoff game between the third and fourth place teams plays the loser of the first/second playoff game in the semi-final. The winner of the semi-final moves on to the final.

1 vs. 2 game
Friday, March 17, 20:00

3 vs. 4 game
Friday, March 17, 13:00

Semifinal
Saturday, March 18, 13:00

Final
Sunday, March 19, 19:00

Statistics

Top 5 player percentages
Round Robin only

Provincial playdowns
Bold indicates winner. Italics indicated defending provincial champion

February 8–12 at the Saville Centre in Edmonton, Alberta

Playoffs
Morris 8–3 Petryk (2B vs 3B)
Ferbey 8–2 MacDonald (2A vs 3A)
Morris 6–5 Ferbey (Quarter-final) 
Johnson 5–3 Martin (A1 vs. B1)
Martin 8–4 Morris (Semi-final)
Martin 7–5 Johnson (Final)

February 15–19 at the Chilliwack Curling Club, Chilliwack, British Columbia

Playoffs
Ursel 7–1 Gretzinger (Semi-final)
Windsor 7–6 Ursel (Final)

The defending champion, Deane Horning did not qualify.

February 8–12, T.G. Smith Centre, Steinbach, Manitoba

February 8–12 at the Capital Winter Club, Fredericton, New Brunswick

Playoffs
Sherrard 5–3 Kennedy (Semi-final)
Grattan 9–6 Sherrard (Final)

Defending champion Wade Blanchard played third for Charlie Sullivan

February 7–12, St. John's Curling Club, St. John's, Newfoundland and Labrador

Tie-breakers
Skanes 12–11 Davidge
Oke 7–5 Symonds
Thomas 11–7 Skanes
Oke 9–8 Thomas

Playoffs
Noseworthy 7–4 Oke
Peddigrew 6–5 Noseworthy

Defending champion Brad Gushue did not participate, as at the time he was representing Canada at the 2006 Winter Olympics in Turin, Italy.

Northern Ontario
February 6–12, Nipigon Curling Club, Nipigon, Ontario

Tie-breakers
Harnden 8–6 Salo
Belec 8–6 Burgess
Scharf 9–6 Harnden
Harnden 8–2 Burgess
Scharf 4–3 Belec

Playoffs
Scharf 5–3 Gordon (1 vs. 2)
Harnden 9–1 Belec (3 vs. 4)
Gordon 6–4 Harnden (Semi-final)
Gordon 7–6 Scharf (Final)

Defending champion Mike Jakubo did not qualify.

February 10–15, Liverpool Curling Club, Liverpool, Nova Scotia

The 2006 Ontario Kia Cup was held February 6–12, Guelph Sports Centre, Guelph, Ontario

Tie-breakers
Matchett 11–9 Jeffries
Matchett 7–5 Epping

Playoffs
Howard 8–7 Middaugh (1 vs. 2)
Harris 8–3 Matchett (3 vs. 4) 
Middaugh 9–5 Harris (Semi-final)
Howard 9–6 Middaugh (Final)

February 8–12, Charlottetown Curling Club, Charlottetown, Prince Edward Island

February 6–12, Arena Conrad-Parent, Sept-Îles, Quebec

Playoffs
Charette 10–4 Crête (A2 vs B3)
Desjardins 8–5 Kennedy (A3 vs B2)
Ménard 6–4 Lafleur (A1 vs B1)
Charette 8–7 Desjardins (Quarter-final)
Charette 7–6 Lafleur (Semi-final)
Ménard 10–5 Charette (Final)

February 8–12, Weyburn Curlin Club, Weyburn, Saskatchewan

/
February 16–19, Whitehorse Curling Club, Whitehorse, Yukon

References

External links
Final on YouTube

2006
Tim Hortons Brier
Tim Hortons Brier
Sports competitions in Regina, Saskatchewan
Curling in Saskatchewan